Åsfrid Svensen (born 21 May 1936) is a Norwegian literary historian.

She was a professor of Nordic literature at the University of Oslo. She has published on Arne Garborg and Olav Duun, among others. She is a member of the Norwegian Academy of Science and Letters.

In 2001 she received the NBU-prisen.

She resides at Vækerø.

References

1936 births
Living people
Norwegian literary historians
Academic staff of the University of Oslo
Members of the Norwegian Academy of Science and Letters